De Férias com o Ex: Celebs 2 is the seventh season of the Brazilian reality television series De Férias com o Ex. It features celebrities and past cast members of the show living together in a luxurious mansion with their ex-partners. The season has been filmed in Ilhabela, São Paulo from January 18 to February 10, 2021. The series is set to premiere on April 8, 2021.

For the first time in history, the show has a transgender cast member.

Cast 
The official list of cast members were released on February 26, 2021. They included six boys: Caíque Gama, Matheus Pasquarelli, Neguin, Pedro Ortega, Rico Melquiades and Tarso Brant, and six girls: Day Camargo, Gabily, Ingrid Ohara, Lary Bottino, Maju Mazalli and Marina Gregory.

Bold indicates original cast member; all other cast were brought into the series as an ex.

Cast duration

 Key:  = "Cast member" is featured in this episode
 Key:  = "Cast member" arrives on the beach
 Key:  = "Cast member" has an ex arrive on the beach
 Key:  = "Cast member" has two exes arrive on the beach
 Key:  = "Cast member" arrives on the beach and has an ex arrive during the same episode
 Key:  = "Cast member" leaves the beach
 Key:  = "Cast member" has an ex arrive on the beach and leaves during the same episode
 Key:  = "Cast member" arrives on the beach and leaves during the same episode
 Key:  = "Cast member" does not feature in this episode

Future Appearances

After this season, in 2021, Rico Melquiades and Lary Bottino appeared in A Fazenda 13. Lary finished in 16th place, while Rico won the competition.

In 2022, Flávio Nakagima appeared in Ilha Record 2, where he won the competition.

In 2022, Ingrid Ohara appeared in A Fazenda 14, she finished in 20th place in the competition.

References

External links
 

7
2021 Brazilian television seasons
Television series impacted by the COVID-19 pandemic